Domenico Ceccarelli (18 August 1905 – October 1985) was an Italian boxer who competed in the 1928 Summer Olympics.

He was born in Rome.

In 1928 he was eliminated in the first round of the light heavyweight class after losing his fight to Don McCorkindale.

External links
Domenico Ceccarelli's profile at Sports Reference.com

1905 births
1985 deaths
Boxers from Rome
Italian male boxers
Light-heavyweight boxers
Olympic boxers of Italy
Boxers at the 1928 Summer Olympics